Mario Candido Sebastián (2 May 1926 – 21 August 2006) was an Argentine water polo player who competed in the 1952 Summer Olympics.

References

External links
 

1926 births
2006 deaths
Argentine male water polo players
Olympic water polo players of Argentina
Water polo players at the 1952 Summer Olympics